In the English or British court, a royal mistress is a woman who is the lover of a member of the royal family, specifically the king. She may be taken either before or after his accession to the throne. Although it generally is only used of females, by extrapolation, the relation can cover any lover of the monarch whether male or female. Queen Elizabeth I is said to have many male favorites although it is not known whether the relationships were sexual or not.

Monarchs have had an incentive to take mistresses in that they generally made dynastic marriages of convenience, and there was often little love in them.

Beyond the physical relationship, the royal mistress has often exercised a profound influence over the king, extending even to affairs of state. Her relationship with the queen could be tense, although some wives appear to have felt little jealousy in the matter.

House of Normandy

Henry I

Henry I had a succession of mistresses before and during his reign, including Nest ferch Rhys, Edith Forne, and Sybil Corbet. The relationship with Sybil lasted over 13 years and may have produced up to five children. He begat at least 24 illegitimate children, more than any other English King.

House of Plantagenet

Henry II

Henry II had several long-term mistresses, including Annabel de Balliol and Rosamund Clifford. He had some illegitimate children with them but his most prominent ones, Geoffrey (later Archbishop of York) and William (later Earl of Salisbury), were with other women.

Edward II

Edward II (25 April 1284 – 21 September 1327), was King of England from 1307 until he was deposed in January 1327. Edward had a very close relationship with Piers Gaveston, who had first joined his household in 1300. The precise nature of Edward and Gaveston's relationship is uncertain; they may have been friends, lovers or sworn brothers. Gaveston's arrogance and power as Edward's favourite provoked discontent both among the barons and the French royal family, and Edward was forced to exile him. On Gaveston's return, the King was pressured into agreeing to wide-ranging reforms called the Ordinances of 1311. Gaveston was banished by the barons, to which Edward responded by revoking the reforms and recalling his favourite. Led by Edward's cousin, the Earl of Lancaster, a group of the barons seized and executed Gaveston in 1312.

Edward III

Edward III appears to have been devoted to his wife, Philippa of Hainault, who bore him 12 children. However, late in their marriage the aged King met Alice Perrers, a young lady-in-waiting to the Queen. Some sources have it that she became his mistress in 1363, six years before his wife's death; others date their relationship to the time when the Queen was terminally ill. The affair was not made public until after the Queen's death, when the King lavished gifts and honours on her.

Richard II

Richard II (6 January 1367– February 1400) was King of England from 1377 until he was deposed on 30 September 1399. A member of the close circle around the king was Robert De Vere, Earl of Oxford (Aubrey De Vere's nephew), who emerged as the King's favourite. De Vere's lineage, while an ancient one, was relatively modest in the peerage of England. Richard's close friendship to De Vere was disagreeable to the political establishment and this displeasure was exacerbated by the earl's elevation to the new title of Duke of Ireland in 1386. The chronicler Thomas Walsingham suggested the relationship between the King and De Vere was of a homosexual nature.

Edward IV

Edward IV had numerous documented mistresses. The best known was Elizabeth Shore, also called Jane Shore.

He reportedly had several illegitimate children:

 By Elizabeth Lucy (or Elizabeth Wayte).
 Elizabeth Plantagenet (born circa 1464), married Thomas Lumley, of Beautrove, Durham before 1478.
 Arthur Plantagenet, 1st Viscount Lisle (1460s/1470s – 3 March 1542).
 By unknown mothers. Recent speculations suggests them as children by Lucy or Waite.
 Grace Plantagenet. She is known to have been present at the funeral of her stepmother Elizabeth Woodville in 1492.
 Mary Plantagenet, married Henry Harman of Ellam, son of Thomas and Elizabeth Harman and widower of certain Agnes.
 Another daughter, said to have been the first wife of John Tuchet, 6th Baron Audley.

The legitimacy of Edward's marriage to Elizabeth Woodville, whom he had secretly wedded in May 1464 without disclosing it to his Parliament until 5 months later, was questioned after Edward's death (9 April 1483) by the Bishop of Bath, Robert Stillington, who claimed he had precontracted in marriage Edward to Lady Eleanor Talbot, daughter of Lord Talbot and widow of Sir Thomas Butler. According to the only copy of the parliamentary act named "Titulus Regius" that survived Henry VII's orders to destroy all such documents, evidence and witnesses were presented to the Lords of Parliament convincing them of the illegitimacy of Edward's and Elizabeth Woodville's children including the 12-year-old Edward who was supposed to inherit the throne as Edward V under the Protectorate of his paternal uncle Richard, Duke of Gloucester. Under the circumstances, the boy's illegitimacy was made public on 22 June and the Lords convened on 25 June in what had to be the new King's first Parliament voted to offer the crown to the only surviving legitimate heir of the House of York, Richard of Gloucester, who ascended the throne as Richard III. Edward's former mistress Jane Shore was arrested because of her involvement in the plot against Richard that on 13 June led to Hasting's execution and the arrest of Bishop Morton and Lord Thomas Stanley (who was pardoned and released before Richard's coronation 3 weeks later). She was condemned to do public penance for adultery and imprisoned, but was later pardoned by King Richard, released from Ludgate prison and allowed to marry his Solicitor General, Thomas Lynom.

Richard III

Richard III had two acknowledged illegitimate children: Katherine Plantagenet, second wife of William Herbert, 2nd Earl of Pembroke and John of Gloucester. Who their mothers were is not known. There is no evidence of infidelity on Richard's part after his marriage to Anne Neville in 1472 when he was around 20 and since Katherine was old enough to be wedded in 1484 and John was old enough to be knighted in 1483 in York Minster (when his half brother Edward, Richard's only legitimate heir, was invested Prince of Wales) and to be made Captain of Calais in March 1485, possibly aged 17 (still a minor, since he would be of age at 21) almost all historians agree these 2 children were fathered during Richard's teen years.

House of Tudor

Henry VII
By contemporary reports, Henry VII seems to have loved his wife, Elizabeth of York and been faithful to her. Although there is no evidence of his ever having had a mistress, some have proposed an illegitimate son for him, Sir Roland de Velville. He was born in 1474, some dozen years before the King's marriage; while it has been favoured in the past, modern scholarship for the most part rejects the supposition.

Henry VIII

By contrast, his son Henry VIII took multiple mistresses in addition to his six wives. The first was supposed to be a Frenchwoman named Jane Popincourt, whom he met in 1514, although their relationship is not certain. She had taught languages to Henry's sisters Margaret and Mary. Little is known of her, though she is said to have been a woman of very loose habits.

His next mistress, Elizabeth Blount, was seventeen or eighteen when she came to his attention in 1518. The affair was ill-concealed, and Katherine of Aragon grew jealous and attempted to separate them, without success. Early in 1519, Elizabeth gave birth to a son, Henry Fitzroy. The King then quit her, and she was afterwards married to Gilbert Tailboys.

Mary Boleyn, an Englishwoman of the French court, replaced her in the King's favour. Like Jane Popincourt, she was known for her promiscuity. Although she was married to Sir William Carey when her affair with Henry began in the early 1520s, Carey is thought to have been compliant. The King was reputed to be the father of her children Catherine Carey and Henry Carey, 1st Baron Hunsdon.

Henry's second wife was Anne Boleyn, sister to Mary Boleyn. While beginning proceedings for his divorce from Katherine of Aragon (as she had borne him no male heir), he attempted to seduce Anne; she repudiated his advances, and he married her instead on 25 January 1533. He is rumoured to have taken another mistress, Mary Shelton, soon after this marriage, but the details are unclear.

Henry went on to marry Jane Seymour, Anne of Cleves, Catherine Howard and Catherine Parr. Jane Seymour, like Anne, refused to be his mistress and became his third wife. From this time there is no record of his having had a mistress; he had enough to do with his wives. His other reputed illegitimate children, Thomas Stukley, John Perrot and Ethelreda Malte, were born in the 1520s.

Other Tudor monarchs

Henry VIII's three children followed him of the throne, but none of them appears to have had a lover. His son Edward VI died before he was sixteen, and was followed by his two sisters Mary I of England and Elizabeth I of England. Elizabeth I's status as a 'Virgin Queen' was an important part of her public image. Although she clearly had favourites, there is no clear evidence that any of these was a lover.

House of Stuart

James I
James I, the first of the Stuart monarchs, is widely believed to have been bisexual, as he had a number of intensely emotional relationships with men throughout his life, including Robert Carr, 1st Earl of Somerset and then George Villiers, 1st Duke of Buckingham. Whether they were friends or lovers is a controversial subject among historians, with the majority believing that a physical relationship is unlikely. Before his accession to the English throne in 1603 James had been linked romantically with Esmé Stewart, 1st Duke of Lennox, and with Anne Murray, later Anne Lyon, Countess of Kinghorne.

Robert Carr, who was Scottish like the King, caught James' attention when he fell off a horse and broke his leg during a tourney. The King took a liking to him, nursed him through his injury and even tried to teach him Latin afterwards. He rose quickly in the court, first to the rank of knight and then becoming Viscount Rochester, being given a seat in the Privy Council, and being created Earl of Somerset in rapid succession. James did not care whether his favourites married or remained single; when Robert Carr expressed love for Frances Howard, a woman already married to Robert Devereux, 3rd Earl of Essex, James had the earlier marriage annulled so that Somerset could lawfully marry Frances. They were wedded on 26 December 1613, just two months after the annulment.

However, Robert's time in the King's affections was cut short. On 15 September 1613, ten days prior to the annulment, Thomas Overbury had died of poison while imprisoned in the Tower of London. Overbury was a friend of Robert but fervently against the marriage to Frances. In April, the supporters of the union had tried to remove him by convincing James I to assign him as his ambassador to the court of Michael of Russia. Overbury was by then too much involved in the case and declined the royal assignment so James had him imprisoned. Overbury had been poisoned with sulphuric acid in the form of copper salts. Edward Coke and Francis Bacon worked together in the trial of the poisoners, which began in 1615. By the time it was over in early 1616, Frances had been found guilty of having hired the poisoners and orchestrated the murder. Robert claimed ignorance but was sentenced to death with his wife as an accomplice. James commuted the sentences to imprisonment. The couple were eventually released but never regained their positions at court.

George Villiers followed after the deposition of Robert Carr, and his rise in royal favour was so quick that contemporaries described it as a flight rather than a growth. Many assumed that his fall from favour would be just as rapid; in preparation, the ambitious Howard family arranged for a boy named William Monson to become known to James. William was the second son of William Monson but would gain greater fame as one of the Regicides of Charles I of England.

However, Villiers proved himself to be far more long-lasting, and James's relationship had a paternal element. James even described George as "my sweet child and wife" while signing himself "your old dad and husband". James married his lover to Katherine Manners, the richest heiress in England and the next-in-line for the title and associated property of the barony of Ros, which she would inherit in 1632. James also showered the Villiers family with titles and money, making them among the most powerful in the kingdom.

Charles II

Charles II has been reckoned the most notorious womanizer of the English kings.

Among his list of mistresses are included: Elizabeth Killigrew, Lucy Walter, Jane Roberts, Catherine Pegge, Winifred Wells, Barbara Villiers, Mary Davis, Nell Gwyn, Louise de Kérouaille, Hortense Mancini, Mrs. Knight, Mary Bagot (widow of Charles Berkeley, 1st Earl of Falmouth) and Elizabeth, Countess of Kildare. Among these women are both the noble and the common: Charles is the first monarch whose mistresses from the lower classes are recorded. These women provided him with fourteen acknowledged bastards.

Barbara Villiers, one of his longest-standing mistresses (fourteen years), was a woman well known for her beauty, as well as her sexual promiscuity and that she had affairs with at least five other men during her tenure as mistress (and it was rumored that one of these affairs was with Charles's own bastard son by Lucy Walter). Barbara also wielded considerable political power, obtaining for her friends and family places on the Privy Council and undermining peace efforts between the Kingdom of England and the Dutch Republic. Another of his mistresses, Louise de Kérouaille, was a known French spy, and the one who followed her, Hortense Mancini, reportedly the wildest and most beautiful of Charles's mistresses, was known to be bisexual. (She was also known to be a lover of Anne Palmer, an illegitimate daughter of Charles II and Barbara Villiers.) The most famous of Charles's mistresses, Nell Gwyn, was a stage actress and had been a prostitute before the King became interested in her. (His dying thoughts are reported to have been a concern that provision should be made for her.)

Despite his numerous illegitimate offspring, Charles II was unable to get an heir from his wife, Catherine of Braganza. His eldest bastard, James Scott, 1st Duke of Monmouth, attempted to prove himself true born, claiming that Charles had actually secretly married his mother, Lucy Walter, while in exile on the continent (if true this event would make Monmouth the legitimate heir to the throne). Monmouth's rebellion failed, at least in part because he could not produce evidence to support his legitimacy, and Lucy is usually considered by historians to be a royal mistress rather than a secret wife.

James II

Charles was succeeded by his younger brother James II, who may have had as many as eleven mistresses. He did not follow the accepted standard of beauty of the time: while his contemporaries sought out heavy-set, voluptuous women on the Baroque model, James was attracted to skinny, boyish young girls in their teens. He was a Catholic, and his brother Charles II remarked in jest that his mistresses were "so ugly that they must have been provided as penance by his confessors". Anne Hyde was his mistress before she became his wife; he met her in 1657 at The Hague and by some reports promised marriage to her when he became her lover a year or so after. She became pregnant, but they were not officially married as was often the custom of the time until the year following, 24 November 1659. His brother Charles II sent lawyers to Breda when Anne Hyde insisted they had been secretly married where the legal marriage was registered in the public records as having taken place there on 24 November 1659. Further confirmation was the confession of James II's sister who on her deathbed confessed that she had set up the untrue slander against Anne. His longest-lasting mistress, Arabella Churchill, was described as nothing but skin and bone. He noticed her while out for a ride; she fell from her horse, exposing her legs. She would bear him four illegitimate children.

Other Stuart monarchs

Charles I was also extremely attached to Villiers, his father's friend, but he is not known to have had a physical relationship with anybody but his wife, Queen Henrietta Maria of France.

Neither Mary II nor Anne had any physical relationships outside of marriage, although Anne had intense emotional attachments to both Sarah Churchill, Duchess of Marlborough and Sarah's cousin Abigail Masham, Baroness Masham, both of whom became politically important.

William III, the husband and co-ruler of Mary II, was presumed to have had one mistress, Elizabeth Villiers.

House of Hanover

George I
George I had divorced his wife Sophia Dorothea of Celle 20 years before his accession to the British throne, and thus brought with him to the Kingdom of Great Britain his long-established mistress: Ehrengard Melusine von der Schulenburg, who was so tall and scrawny that she was nicknamed "the maypole". Sophia von Kielmansegg, sometimes referred to as a mistress of George I, was actually his morganatic half-sister; they were both children of Ernest Augustus, Elector of Hanover. She was known to compete for influence with Melusine and assumed, or pretended, to be a mistress by the British courtiers.

George II

George II had only one principal mistress, Henrietta Howard, who maintained this station for well over a decade. It is probable that George II considered having a mistress necessary, for he was very much in love with his wife Caroline of Brandenburg-Ansbach. He made a point of visiting Henrietta for several hours each night, locking the door, but most agreed that they spent their time playing cards. However, when she became deaf in her early forties, he quickly became bored with her, and they parted amiably. George II did not take another mistress after his wife's death of umbilical rupture on 20 November 1737, until Amalie von Wallmoden, Countess of Yarmouth.

George III

George III followed the more chaste examples of his father Frederick, Prince of Wales and grandfather George II. He took no serious mistress during his reign. This comparative virtue was favored by the increasingly chaste moral standards of the time. However he was later rumoured to have secretly married Hannah Lightfoot prior to his public wedding to Charlotte of Mecklenburg-Strelitz.

George IV

His son George IV, first prince regent during George III's periods of insanity and then King following his death, carried on an affair of twenty years with a widow, Maria Fitzherbert, with whom he lived and considered his true wife. He was reported to have even married her, even though he became increasingly unfaithful and accepted the paternity of several illegitimate children throughout this time period. Afterwards, he rejected any possible marriage he might have made with Mrs. Fitzherbert. His other notable mistresses included Mary Robinson, Frances Twysden, Grace Elliott, Isabella Seymour-Conway, Marchioness of Hertford and Elizabeth Conyngham, Marchioness Conyngham.

George IV and his legitimate wife Caroline of Brunswick were never fond of their arranged marriage and lived separately from 1796 to her death on 7 August 1821. Their only daughter Princess Charlotte of Wales was born very early in the marriage. That both George and Caroline took other lovers was not therefore unexpected. George survived his only legitimate daughter.

William IV

George was succeeded by his younger brother William IV on 26 June 1830. William had cohabited with his mistress Dorothea Jordan from the late 1780s to 1811. He married his wife Adelaide of Saxe-Meiningen on 11 July 1818. They were reputed to have a happy marriage until his death on 20 June 1837 and evidence of any other mistress is absent.

Victoria

Queen Victoria married her husband Albert when she was 20, and the two enjoyed a devoted marriage until his death in 1861. In grief-stricken widowhood she largely closed herself away from the world. However, in the latter part of her reign, there was contemporary gossip around her manservant and friend John Brown. Some more far-fetched accounts even suggested a secret marriage. In reality, there is no evidence that the relationship was anything other than platonic.

House of Saxe-Coburg and Gotha

Edward VII
Victoria's son Edward VII, who ascended on 22 January 1901, was notorious for his many infidelities—however, each of these affairs was carried out in a kind and discreet manner, which did much to endear him to his subjects. His notable mistresses included a French actress, Hortense Schneider, Giulia Barucci, who boasted that she was the "greatest whore in the world", Susan Pelham-Clinton, who had already eloped twice, Lillie Langtry, an actress who had also been courted by Edward's brother and an Austrian prince, Daisy Greville, Countess of Warwick, Agnes Keyser, and Alice Keppel, who of all his mistresses had the most political power and sat at his deathbed in 1910. He fathered surprisingly few royal bastards considering his many mistresses and the fecundity he enjoyed with his wife Alexandra of Denmark.

House of Windsor

Edward VIII

Edward VIII kept mistresses openly. Among them were mostly married women like Freda Dudley Ward and Lady Thelma Furness.

He first met Wallis Simpson in San Diego, California in 1920, and they became lovers in 1934. When he ascended the throne in 1936 she had divorced her first husband and was in the process of divorcing her second husband, Ernest; nevertheless, Edward wished to marry her. This was against all precedent; the teaching of the contemporary Church of England, of which Edward as King was Supreme Governor, was that divorcees could not remarry within the lifetime of former spouses. Commonwealth Prime Ministers were not unanimous on whether the marriage would be unconstitutional, but there was considerable opposition, led by the British Government and the Archbishops. Public sympathy was similarly divided, and the issue threatened to become a constitutional crisis: morganatic marriages had not been known in Britain. On 11 December 1936, Edward abdicated and left the United Kingdom so that he could marry his mistress; he did so and lived as Duke of Windsor in exile until his death.

Charles III
Charles III, who ascended on 8 September 2022, engaged in an on-and-off affair with Camilla Parker Bowles starting from 1972 and later admitted that he had never loved his first wife, Lady Diana Spencer, whom he felt obligated to marry (in 1981). This created a generally bad public image for Prince Charles, and public sentiment prevented him from marrying Camilla immediately after his divorce and Diana's death in 1997. However, public anger subsided, and after receiving the Queen's consent in 2005, they were finally married in a civil ceremony on 9 April 2005. Upon Charles's accession, Camilla became Queen Consort. Notably, Camilla is the great-granddaughter of Alice Keppel, one of Edward VII's mistresses.

Dale Tryon, Baroness Tryon (nicknamed "Kanga") was another married woman whom Charles kept as a mistress while Prince of Wales. She died in 1997.

See also
 Royal mistress

References

External links 
 

 
 
English royalty
Lists of royal mistresses